"Lay It Down" is a 1994 single by Magnapop from the album Hot Boxing, released by Play It Again Sam Records on CD (catalogue number 450.0267.22 - BIAS 267 CD) and 12" gramophone record (450.0267.30 - BIAS 267.) A promo CD edition was released by Priority Records as DPRO 50820. A live recording of the song appears on the German edition of 2005's Mouthfeel and the song also appears on 1993's Kiss My Mouth. A music video was created for the song in 1994.

The song topped the De Afrekening poll in 1994.

Track listing
All songs written by Linda Hopper and Ruthie Morris
"Lay It Down" – 3:03
"Slowly, Slowly" – 3:41
"The Crush" – 3:20
"Piece of Cake" – 2:48

Personnel
Magnapop
Linda Hopper – lead vocals
David McNair – drums
Ruthie Morris – lead guitar
Shannon Mulvaney – bass guitar

Production staff
David Collins – remastering at A&M Studios
Valerie Raimonde – design
Ruth Leitman – art direction, photography
Bob Mould – production
Jim Wilson – engineering

External links

"Lay It Down" at Discogs

1994 singles
Magnapop songs
PIAS Recordings singles
Song recordings produced by Bob Mould
Songs written by Ruthie Morris
Songs written by Linda Hopper
1994 songs